La Academia USA is the first musical reality show with only Hispanic contestants launched by Azteca America in October 2005. The auditions were done nationwide and a total of 30 people were chosen to go to Mexico where they would have to spend a week working hard and showing all of what they had inside to be chosen to the final 18.

The first La Academia USA concert was on November 20, 2005.

A week before the first concert, there was a special show that lasted two hours. In that show, footage from the auditions was shown. At the end, 12 of the 30 were eliminated leaving the lucky 18 that Azteca America had chosen to become the first generation of La Academia USA.

One of the participants was Michael Muenchow Rivera, who was previously on Telemundo's song-based reality show Nuevas Voces De America in 2005;  he was one of the 18 selected. Michael lives in San Antonio, Texas and made it to the top 13 final singers, before being expelled. His vote off was one of the results that caused the most uproar among viewers and the teachers alike. This was also true for the premature elimination, in the eleventh concert, of Diana, whom many thought would become the winner of La Academia USA for her great voice, big popularity among the public and the good comments by the critics.

After three months of competition La Academia USA came to an end, crowning Mariana Vargas as winner of the Latin Reality Show. As the winner and runner-up, Mariana and Gustavo respectively received contracts with Warner Music for the release of an album.

After the show ended and after the cancellation of the highly anticipated "La Academia Hot-Tour" many of the ex-students of La Academia USA, including Michael, Diana, Frankie, Fatimat, Jazmin, Alex ("El Chino") and Nohelia were called back to continue singing together for their fans across the United States. Among other projects is the formation of a band by joining the voices of Ivannkie, Adán, Catalina and Heloisa.

Being a Latin American event and taking place in an ethnically diverse country, La Academia USA featured participants born in different Latin countries, or at least with Latin roots being born in the United States. Here are some countries where most come from: Mexico, Venezuela, Honduras, Colombia, Puerto Rico, the Dominican Republic and Brazil.

Frankie Alvarado in 2007 Frankie participated in a duet with Spanish Pop rock singer Diana Mera; the song is called "20 Pedacitos".

Participants (2005–2006)

Winner
 Blanca Mariana Vargas Grajeda

Finalists
 2nd place: Gustavo Alfonso Amezcua Fuentes
 3rd place: Nohelia María Sosa Guerrero
 4th place: Afid Ferrer Ávalos
 5th place: Yoshigei Cázares Silva

Eliminated
 Jazmín Olivo Ceballos
 Francisco Alvarado Rivera (Frankie)
 Adán Castillo
 Iván Quiñonez (ivannkie)
 Diana Galindo Martínez
 Heloisa Alves
 Catalina Naranjo
 Michael Anthony Muenchow
 Gabriel Juan Rodríguez Policastro
 Alejandro Hernández López (El Chino)
 Carlos Soto García
 Bianca Filio Martínez
 Fatimat Aihassan Villanueva

Order of expulsion

 The contestant was expelled
 The contestant won the competition
 The contestant was a runner-up
Heloisa Alves was an anchor for the sports show Los Protagonistas a Nivel mundial for TV AZTECA AMERICA during the 2006 Soccer World Cup, and she won the Miss Brazil USA contest in November 2007. Heloisa has recorded commercials for Bally Total Fitness, and she has done publicity for Cingular Wireless.

External links
– La Academia USA Official Site

USA
2000s American reality television series
2005 American television series debuts